Moghavemat Sari Football Club is an Iranian football club based in Sari, Iran. They competed in the 2009–10 Iran Football's 2nd Division.

Season-by-Season

The table below shows the achievements of the club in various competitions.

See also
 Hazfi Cup
 Iran Football's 2nd Division 2009–10

Football clubs in Iran
Association football clubs established in 2005
2005 establishments in Iran